Joey Sturgis (born January 3, 1985) is an American record producer and owner of The Foundation Recording Studio in Connersville, Indiana. Sturgis started recording in 2004 including producing the Asking Alexandria single "The Final Episode" which has gone on to earn an RIAA certified Gold Record. He also received RIAA-certified Gold Records for Asking Alexandria's "Not the American Average", "Moving On" and Of Mice & Men's "Second and Sebring". He has recorded over 100 albums in his career, and was known for doing a majority of the workload by himself in his early years, including engineering, mixing, mastering, and production.

Sturgis is also the founder and president of Joey Sturgis Tones, which are his own line of audio recording plugins. In 2015, he co-founded URM Academy, an online school for rock and metal mixing and production. He also co-founded Drumforge, a drum software program, and Riffhard, which is an online school for guitarists. He also started the Joey Sturgis Forum Podcast, which is now known as the URM Podcast.

Production discography

Studio albums

2000s

2010s

EPs

Compilations

Remix

Entrepreneurship

Joey Sturgis Tones 
Joey Sturgis Tones are audio plugins launched and created by Joey Sturgis. Sturgis began his journey with a background in computer science during high school combined with his ability to pick up any instrument he could get his hands on. This eventually became the catalyst for his passion in audio software creation. He programmed and designed his first plugin, "Gain Reduction" a compression plugin that was praised by acclaimed producer Chris Lorde-Alge at NAMM in 2018. He has also released plugins in collaboration with Howard Benson, Rex Brown of Pantera, Misha Mansour of Periphery, Jeff Loomis of Arch Enemy, Ben Bruce of Asking Alexandria, multi-platinum country producer Billy Decker and others. His plugins have been used on everything from metal, to country, to pop songs such as 10,000 hours by Dan + Shay and Justin Bieber.

Unstoppable Recording Machine 
URM Academy is an online audio school created by Joey Sturgis, Joel Wanasek and Eyal Levi, which describes itself as "the world's best online music school for rock & metal producers". Through its program Nail The Mix, the platform offers monthly mixing sessions with professionally-recorded songs and livestream commentary from the producer who originally mixed them. The program has featured bands such as Lamb of God, Asking Alexandria, The Devil Wears Prada, Chelsea Grin, Born of Osiris, A Day to Remember, Opeth, Neck Deep, Papa Roach, Meshuggah, Periphery, Gojira, Spiritbox, Angels and Airwaves, Conquer Divide, Knocked Loose, Animals As Leaders etc. and producers such as Tom Lorde-Alge, Andrew Wade, Tue Madsen, Devin Townsend, Logan Mader, Jens Bogren, Kane Churko, Machine, Daniel Braunstein, Dave Otero, Will Putney among others. Nail the Mix has won two "2 Comma Club" Awards from ClickFunnels for "entrepreneurs who have used ClickFunnels to grow their business to the 7-figure mark".
The platform also offers a podcast, Q&As, lessons ("Fast Track") and, as part of its Enhanced subscription, "Mix Rescue", where students submit their own mixes to be critiqued and cleaned-up during a live broadcast.

Drumforge 
Drumforge is a music software company founded by Joey Sturgis, Joel Wanasek and Joe Wohlitz that provides drum sample libraries and audio plug-ins.
The company has released libraries by Taylor Larson, Luke Holland, Daniel Bergstrand, Matt Greiner and others.

Riffhard 

Riffhard is an online guitar school created by Monuments guitarist John Browne, in partnership with URM Academy, and co-owned by Eyal Levi and Joel Wanasek, mainly dedicated to rhythm guitar.

Other projects 

He also started the Joey Sturgis Forums Podcast, now known as the URM Podcast, which was said to "cover a range of music industry topics such as marketing, touring, mixing and producing"

Sturgis has been an active member of The Recording Academy since 2017, advocating for improving the rock and metal categories and encouraging more people to participate.

Mentorship 

Over the years, prior to starting URM Academy, Sturgis mentored a handful of up-and-coming producers who eventually gained notoriety, such as Nick Sampson, Nick Scott, Nick Matzkows, Landon Tewers, Johnny Franck and Caleb Shomo of Beartooth. He also mentored two-time Grammy-Nominated Tyler Smyth in his early days. Smyth started the band Dangerkids and is now known for his work with I Prevail and Falling In Reverse.

References

External links
 Allmusic Production Credits
 Artist Direct Production Credits
 Foundation Foundation Recording Studio

1985 births
Living people
Record producers from Indiana
People from Connersville, Indiana